Checheikhen was a daughter of Genghis Khan and his first wife Börte.

Marriage

When, in 1207, Genghis Khan sent his son Jochi to subdue the northern tribes, the Oirats were the first to offer an alliance to Genghis Khan. As part of this alliance, his daughter Checheyikhen married Torolchi, one of the sons of the Oirat chieftain Khudugha Beki. One of Jochi's daughters, Checheyikhen's niece, married another. At her marriage, Genghis told her to govern and control the Oirat people. Her husband would not stay with her, but serve under Genghis Khan as one of his gurugen, or sons-in-law. Her control over the Oirat gave the Mongols control over the northern trade routes. Since her sisters co-administered important parts of the Silk Route, the commercial interdependence between their respective lands increased.

Aftermath of Checheyikhen's death

In 1237, likely after Checheyikhen died, her brother Ögedei Khan seized the Oirat lands and allegedly had 4000 young Oirat girls raped. The Oirat now came under his direct control.

Orghana was her daughter.
Oghul Qaimish was also possibly one of her daughters.

Notes

Sources
 

Women of the Mongol Empire
13th-century Mongolian women
12th-century Mongolian women
13th-century deaths
Year of birth unknown
Genghis Khan